The 2022 season for  is the 38th season in the team's existence and the eighth season under the current name. The team has been a UCI WorldTeam since 2005, when the tier was first established. They use Ridley bicycles, Shimano drivetrain, DT Swiss wheels and Vermarc clothing.

Team roster 

Riders who joined the team for the 2022 season

Riders who left the team during or after the 2021 season

Season victories

National, Continental, and World Champions

Notes

References

External links 

 

Lotto–Soudal
2022
Lotto–Soudal